"Faxing Berlin" is an instrumental by Canadian electronic music producer Deadmau5. It was released as the lead single from his third studio album Random Album Title. On July 23, 2007, "Faxing Berlin" became the first release on Deadmau5's label Mau5trap. The track was originally known as "Da Outer Limits", but was renamed to "Faxing Berlin" later on, during a phone call with Max Graham, when Graham left "to fax [something] over to Berlin".

Composition
"Faxing Berlin" is a progressive house song with a tempo of 128 beats per minute and is written in the key of D minor.

Controversy
In 2008, an artist called DirtyCircuit claimed to have been threatened with legal action after using the sample "LP_Faxing Berlin C_128bpm" that came bundled with FL Studio, which Deadmau5 claimed copyright for. The sample was a direct clip of a full bar of the song. Deadmau5 provided a demo track which came bundled with FL Studio, along with several loop samples. The case caused a slight discomfort among the users of FL Studio, some of which have pointed out potential inconsistencies in the EULA of the software.

Formats and track listings

Chart performance
Following the release of Random Album Title, "Faxing Berlin" entered Hot Dance Club Songs at #50 on March 3, 2009 and stayed on the chart for 12 more weeks, peaking at #6.

Release history

References

External links
 
 
 
 

2006 debut singles
Deadmau5 songs
House music songs
2006 songs
Songs written by Deadmau5